Yona Kosashvili (July 3, 1970) is an Israeli chess Grandmaster and surgeon.

Personal life
Yona Kosashvili was born in Tbilisi, Georgia. He is a graduate of Tel Aviv University in Medicine, as part of the academic reserve Atuda. At the 1990 Israeli Chess Championship, he finished in third place. In 1993, at the age of 23, he received a GM title in chess. Kosashvili previously managed the orthopedic department at Kaplan Medical Center, and currently heads the orthopedic department at Beilinson Hospital. Kosashvili has published about 100 research papers in the field of orthopedics.

In 1999 he married Sofia Polgar. They are the parents of two children. Kosashvili lived with his family for about 3 years in Toronto, Canada, where he worked as an orthopedic surgeon. He currently lives with his family in Ganei Tikva.

External links
 Official website 
 Biography at Sofia Polgar's official site
 
 The chess games of Yona Kosashvili at chessgames.com

1970 births
Living people
Chess coaches
Chess grandmasters
Chess Olympiad competitors
Georgian emigrants to Israel
Israeli expatriates in Canada
Israeli chess players
Israeli surgeons
Jewish chess players
Jewish Israeli sportspeople
Jews from Georgia (country)
Academic staff of Tel Aviv University